Anthony Delon (born September 30, 1964) is a French-American actor, and son of actors Alain Delon and Nathalie Delon.

Biography
Delon is the former boyfriend of Princess Stéphanie of Monaco. He married Sophie Clerico on June 27, 2006; they separated in 2012. They have two daughters, born in 1996 and 2001. Anthony has one daughter (born 1986) with Marie-Hélène Le Borges, a former dancer at the Crazy Horse in Paris.

Selected filmography
 A Thorn in the Heart (1986)
 Chronicle of a Death Foretold (1987)
 Desert of Fire (1997)
 La Vérité si je mens ! (1997)
 Frenchman's Creek (1998)
 Amour de Femme  (2001)
 Paris Connections (2010)
 Polisse (2011)

References

External links
 

1964 births
Living people
French male film actors
French male television actors
French male stage actors
French people of Corsican descent
French people of Spanish descent
Anthony